Harrisville is a census-designated place (CDP) and village in the town of Burrillville in Providence County, Rhode Island, United States. The population was 1,605 at the 2010 census. Much of the community composes a historic district listed on the National Register of Historic Places. The village was named after nineteenth century manufacturer Andrew Harris. Previously, the village was named Rhodesville, after Captain William Rhodes, an eighteenth century privateer.

Geography
Harrisville is located at  (41.968481, -71.680011).

According to the United States Census Bureau, the CDP has a total area of 2.2 km (0.9 mi). 2.1 km (0.8 mi) of it is land and 0.1 km (0.04 mi) of it (3.53%) is water.

Demographics

At the 2000 census there were 1,561 people, 655 households, and 417 families in the CDP. The population density was 744.1/km (1,923.5/mi). There were 677 housing units at an average density of 322.7/km (834.2/mi).  The racial makeup of the CDP was 98.72% White, 0.13% African American, 0.13% Native American, 0.06% Asian, 0.51% from other races, and 0.45% from two or more races. Hispanic or Latino of any race were 0.19%.

Of the 655 households 33.0% had children under the age of 18 living with them, 47.3% were married couples living together, 12.4% had a female householder with no husband present, and 36.3% were non-families. 32.2% of households were one person and 17.3% were one person aged 65 or older. The average household size was 2.38 and the average family size was 3.04.

The age distribution was 25.4% under the age of 18, 8.1% from 18 to 24, 31.5% from 25 to 44, 20.5% from 45 to 64, and 14.5% 65 or older. The median age was 37 years. For every 100 females, there were 84.7 males. For every 100 females age 18 and over, there were 79.6 males.

The median household income was $40,430 and the median family income  was $51,141. Males had a median income of $41,731 versus $26,420 for females. The per capita income for the CDP was $21,969. About 9.7% of families and 13.9% of the population were below the poverty line, including 26.6% of those under age 18 and 14.5% of those age 65 or over.

See also 
 National Register of Historic Places listings in Providence County, Rhode Island

References

Census-designated places in Providence County, Rhode Island
Villages in Providence County, Rhode Island
Historic districts in Providence County, Rhode Island
Burrillville, Rhode Island
Providence metropolitan area
Villages in Rhode Island
Census-designated places in Rhode Island
Historic districts on the National Register of Historic Places in Rhode Island
National Register of Historic Places in Providence County, Rhode Island